Agris Elerts (born 17 June 1967) is a Latvian luger. He competed at the 1992 Winter Olympics and the 1994 Winter Olympics.

References

External links
 

1967 births
Living people
Latvian male lugers
Olympic lugers of Latvia
Lugers at the 1992 Winter Olympics
Lugers at the 1994 Winter Olympics
People from Ilūkste
20th-century Latvian people